The Zeeuws Maritime MuZEEum is a maritime museum in the center of Vlissingen, situated on the marina of the city. It is the successor of the Stedelijk Museum in Vlissingen. It is housed in a building once owned by the Lampsins family, prominent in the shipping business in the 17th century.

Building
The muZEEum is housed in a building complex with buildings from the 16th, 17th, 18th and 21st century. These buildings are connected by modern architecture. One of the main parts of the complex is the Lampsinshuis. The Zeeland merchant Cornelis Lampsins had this house built in the then new style of Dutch Classicism in 1641 on the English Quay (now Nieuwendijk). He moved into it as a residence, but also established the office of the renowned trading house Lampsins which among other things employed Michiel de Ruyter, at the age of 12, in the function as Roper. Behind the Lampsinshuis is also the original warehouses of the City Palace that are also this part of the complex. In 2002 the construction began of this complex, designed by RGD Architect Marc van Roosmalen.

In the "Lampsinshuis' the permanent collection is displayed in the Zeeland maritime history. It is organised in the structured layer way of looking at History developed by Fernand Braudel. On each floor can be found this classified theme. The four levels are also arranged thematically as Water, Work, Glory and Adventure.

The Warehouses are temporary exhibitions hosting work by a top regional artist. In addition, the muZEEum has one smaller exhibition hall the "Schelde Hall" where temporary exhibitions are exhibited with a local maritime character.

The museum brasserie Gecroonde Love is named after one of the ships of Michiel de Ruyter.

Collection

The museum's permanent collection consists of the city's historical artifacts and objects showing the maritime history of Zeeland. Inside, the sub-collections and study collections are classified according to the Museum Inventarisatie Project (MusIP).

The Historical Collection of the Town and Municipality of Vlissingen

Objects from the historical art collection, include:

 The Silver Guild's documents  
 Paintings  
 Construction and interior fragments, including tiles and bricks.
 Craftwork
 Furniture and interior design elements, including hobs and birdcages in the form of historic buildings  
 Paintings and models related to the Second World War by Cees van Burght
 Prints

The ship's archaeological collection
Objects from the following Vereenigde Oost-Indische Compagnie (VOC) ships:

 't Vliegent Hart
 Rooswijk 
 Geldermalsen
 Campen
 Woestduin

Zeeland maritime collection

 Portraits, including Michiel de Ruyter and Anna van Gelder, Joost de Moor, Joost Banckert and Geleyn Loncque, utilitarian and decorative objects from the property of Zeeland heroes 
 Tools and equipment [12]
 Maritime prints [13]
 Ship Models of vessels of Zeeland and Flemish fishing, Olau Line and VOC pilotage ships, an 18th-century slave ship [15] and models of diving and salvage methods. 
 After removal of the Provincial Steamboat Services in Zeeland utensils, ship models, marine ornamental uniforms and other objects by the Province of Zeeland given to muZEEum.
 The clearance of wrecks in the Westerschelde, as a result of agreements with Belgium for the deepening of the Scheldt, by Rijkswaterstaat artefacts; including ship decorations, German World War II tableware and personal belongings for the collection.
 Paintings and realia related to the Zeeland Steamship Company.
 Paintings, maps, sculptures and artefacts from former water board of the Zeeland Islands.

Study Collection 
The muZEEum owns in addition to the displayed collection also study collections.

Numismatic collection 
Carel Albert Woelderen donated coins and medals from his collection, the basis for the formation of one of the largest numismatic collections in the Netherlands of more than 3,500 items.

Among other coins on display are Spanish ones from the VOC ship, Rooswijk, which sank in 1740 off the Goodwin Sands in the English Channel.

Tiles
Originating from the renovation of downtown Flushing are approximately 4,000 wall tiles from the 16th, 17th and 18th centuries.

Art Collection
In addition to the paintings by members of the Art Society of the South, the muZEEum owns work of several other artists:

 Jan Pieter van Baurscheidt de Jonge
 Jan François Brouwenaar
 Cornelis van der Burght
 Alfons Josephus van Dijck
 Philip van Dijk
 Charles Howard Hodges
 Wim Hofman
 Engel Hoogerheyden
 Anselmus van Hulle
 Cees Kimmel
 Johannus Hermanus Koekkoek
 Maarten Krabbé
 Gerard van Lom
 Cornelis Louw
 Eugène Lücker

 Lex de Meester
 Salomon Mesdach
 John-Henry Mohrmann
 Jan Willem Pieneman
 Nicolaas Pieneman
 Leendert van de Pool
 Jan de Quelery
 Han Reijnhout
 Jan Sanders
 Johannes Christiaan Schotel
 Johann Friedrich August Tischbein
 Pieter van de Velde
 Eugène Wolters
 Pieter Christoffel Wonder

Other Information 
The muZEEum has a modest private museum library, where information regarding the collection can be found. Additionally the literature collection contains several historical books, including the bibliography of Michiel de Ruyter by Gerard Brandt. Specifically, the complete edition of travel issued by the Linschoten Vereeniging.

Awards
In 2004, the muZEEum was nominated for the European Museum of the Year Award. In 2008 the museum won the Artifex Award in the category "Increasing visitor numbers". The award is presented by the Cultureel Organisatiebureau Artifex (Artifex Cultural Organisation) and the Platform voor Museale Ontvangsten (Platform for Curatorial Revenue and Events)  
Additionally muZEEum has received nominations for the Bouwfonds Award and the Schreuder Prize.

References

Buildings and structures in Vlissingen
Museums in Zeeland
Maritime museums in the Netherlands